Imogen Allison (born 24 April 1998) is an English netball player, who has represented the national side since 2020. At club level, she is the captain of Team Bath and has previously played for Yorkshire Jets.

Club career
Allison plays as a wing defence. She played for Yorkshire Jets in the 2016 Netball Superleague season. She joined Team Bath ahead of the 2017 season. She re-signed for Bath for the 2018 season.

During the 2019 season, Allison was Bath's captain when regular captains Eboni Usoro-Brown and Serena Guthrie were away on international duty. She was shortlisted for the 2019 Superleague Young Player of the Year Award, and later re-signed for Bath for the 2020 season. She was named Bath's Player of the Year for the 2021 Netball Superleague season, and later captained Bath in the 2021 British Fast5 Netball All-Stars Championship, a tournament which they won. In January 2022, she was named the team's captain for the 2022 Netball Superleague season. Bath coach Anna Stembridge told Allison that she would be captain on FaceTime, as Allison was at the 2022 Netball Quad Series at the time. She missed a March 2022 match against Wasps after testing positive for COVID-19.

International career
Allison competed for England-under 21s at the 2017 Netball World Youth Cup, where the team finished third overall. She was a co-captain of the England A side for fixtures alongside the 2020 Netball Nations Cup.

She was in the England senior squad for a 2019 tour of Oceania, and also for the 2020 Taini Jamison Trophy Series. She made her debut for the senior team at the age of 22 in October 2020, coming on as a replacement for Jade Clarke. She played in the 2021 Vitality Roses Reunited Series and the 2022 Netball Quad Series. Allison was named as a reserve in the England squad for the netball event at the 2022 Commonwealth Games. On 17 July, she replaced the injured Beth Cobden in the England squad for the Games.

Personal life
Allison attended The Brooksbank School and started playing netball in Year Seven. She later studied Sports & Exercise Science at the University of Bath.

References

External links
 Team Bath Profile

1998 births
Living people
English netball players
Team Bath netball players
Netball players at the 2022 Commonwealth Games
Netball Superleague players
Yorkshire Jets players